The Delaware United States House election for 1804 was held October 13–20, 1804. The incumbent Representative Caesar Augustus Rodney was defeated by the former Representative James A. Bayard Sr., whom he had defeated in the previous election, with 52.12% of the vote.

Results

Results by county

See also 
 Delaware's at-large congressional district special election, 1805
 United States House of Representatives elections, 1804 and 1805
 List of United States representatives from Delaware

References

Delaware
1804
1804 Delaware elections